Closed ecological systems (CES) are ecosystems that do not rely on matter exchange with any part outside the system.

The term is most often used to describe small, manmade ecosystems. Such systems are scientifically interesting and can potentially serve as a life-support system during space flights, in space stations or space habitats.

In a closed ecological system, any waste products produced by one species must be used by at least one other species. If the purpose is to maintain a life form, such as a mouse or a human, waste products such as carbon dioxide, feces and urine must eventually be converted into oxygen, food, and water.

A closed ecological system must contain at least one autotrophic organism. While both chemotrophic and phototrophic organisms are plausible, almost all closed ecological systems to date are based on an autotroph such as green algae.

Examples 

A closed ecological system for an entire planet is called an ecosphere.

Man-made closed ecological systems which were created to sustain human life include Biosphere 2, MELiSSA, and the BIOS-1, BIOS-2, and BIOS-3 projects.

Bottle gardens and aquarium ecospheres are partially or fully enclosed glass containers that are self-sustaining closed ecosystems that can be made or purchased. They can include tiny shrimp, algae, gravel, decorative shells, and Gorgonia.

In fiction

See also

References

Emerging technologies
Ecological processes
Systems ecology